Lidia ter Beek is a Dutch Paralympian.

She competed at the 1976 Summer Paralympics, winning a gold medal in 100 metre backstroke.

See also
Paralympic sports
Sport in the Netherlands

References 

Living people
Year of birth missing (living people)
Paralympic swimmers of the Netherlands
20th-century Dutch women
20th-century Dutch people